Thrixspermum japonicum, known as East Asian thrixspermum, is a species of orchid native to Korea, south-central and southern Japan, and parts of China (Fujian, Guangdong, Guizhou, Hunan, Sichuan, Taiwan).

References

External links

japonicum
Orchids of Japan
Orchids of Korea
Orchids of China
Plants described in 1866